Shane Michael Howard  (born 26 January 1955) is an Australian singer-songwriter and guitarist, he was the mainstay of folk rock group Goanna (1977–85, 1998) which had hit singles with "Solid Rock" (September 1982, No. 3) and "Let the Franklin Flow" (May 1983, No. 12) on the Kent Music Report and their album, Spirit of Place (November 1982, No. 2). After their disbandment he pursued a solo career.

Biography

1955-1975: Early life 
He is the middle child of seven children of an Irish Catholic family living in a cramped factory cottage. His father, Leo, was a worker at the local Nestlés powdered milk factory, for 48 years. Howard loved music, led by his mother, Teresa, who played the piano and sang. 

According to Howard's younger sister, Marcia Howard, they were colloquially called, "The Von Trapp Family of the Western District", because they played and sang at local celebrations. Howard attended St Joseph’s Christian Brothers' College, Warrnambool. "Elder brothers and sisters brought The Beatles, Dylan and Van Morrison and countless other influences into my already crowded imagination." His eldest brother, Eric, brought a guitar into the house and homework suffered thereafter.

After secondary education Howard moved to Melbourne, where he studied at Monash University for a year, before hitch hiking around Australia, busking and playing at folk clubs. During this time he worked in various jobs: picking grapes, picking ginger, screen printing, the railways, washing dishes and teaching. He studied Education at Deakin University, Geelong where he became their first Student Council president.

1976–1985: Goanna

By 1976 Howard had enrolled at Geelong Teachers College, and was recruiting people for a new folk-rock band. Originally known as the Ectoplasmic Manifestation. In late 1977 the group changed their name to the Goanna Band (later shortened to Goanna). Their set list included Bob Dylan and Little Feat cover versions. They performed at venues along the Great Ocean Road, in Victoria. Their line-up was fluid, with Howard as the sole mainstay; Australian music journalist, Ed Nimmervoll, opined that it was "as casual and non-competitive as a country town compared to the Big City. They were worlds away from whatever pop music was the going thing in the big city. Just doing their own thing. There was never a permanent line-up. Just Shane and his friends, picking up a following by playing to surfies and 'heads' along Victoria's coastal regions." Rose Bygrave joined on keyboards and vocals in 1979.

In May 1981, on a doctor's advice, Howard took a month's hiatus from performing and travelled to Uluru: 

While travelling back to Melbourne, Howard began working on a song, "Stand Y'r Ground" (which became "Stand Your Ground"). Its lyrics didn't match their folk-rock music style. He put it aside, and developed a different, rougher melody with new lyrics. When he arrived in Melbourne, he had a new song for the group to record, based upon his experiences at Uluru, "Solid Rock". Goanna were the opening act on James Taylor's 1981 Australian tour, which eventually led to a record deal with WEA (Warner Bros.' Australian affiliate) in February 1982. At that time, his sister, Marcia joined the group on backing vocals.

In September 1982 "Solid Rock", from Goanna's debut album, Spirit of Place (November 1982), was released as a single. Australian musicologist, Ian McFarlane, described it as "a damning indictment of the European invasion of Australia. WEA was reluctant to issue it as the first single, and indeed the band felt it had little commercial appeal." Both the single and its associated album peaked at No. 2 on the respective Kent Music Report charts.

By February 1983 the line-up was the Howards and Bygrave with Peter Coughlan on bass guitar, Graham Davidge on guitar, Warrick Harwood on guitar and backing vocals, Mick O'Connor on organ and Robbie Ross on drums. Lisa Perry of The Canberra Times caught their local performance; she opined that they provided, "a night of solid Australian rock and roll... The throaty vocals of keyboards whiz [Bygrave] rang clear through some very slick guitar work from leader Shane Howard and guitarists [Davidge] and [Harwood]."

In May 1983 Goanna used the pseudonym, Gordon Franklin and the Wilderness Ensemble, to release "Let the Franklin Flow" as a single, "in support of the Tasmanian Wilderness Society's campaign against the proposed damming of Tasmania's Franklin River." (see Franklin Dam controversy#Blockade). At a live performance, Stop the Drop (for nuclear disarmament), at the Sidney Myer Music Bowl on 13 February that year, an ad hoc ensemble had Goanna joined by members of fellow Australian groups, Redgum and Midnight Oil, which recorded a live version of the track. Howard, the song's writer, was credited as F. River. The single reached No. 12 nationally. The concert was simulcast on national TV and radio and it was released as a video recording, Stop the Drop: a Concert for Nuclear Disarmament in 1983.

The group's second studio album, Oceania, appeared in April 1985, which peaked at No. 29 but the group disbanded in October of that year. In December 1988 Howard explained the reasons for their split, "we tried to change and stop being so commercial, but we changed too much and it failed. We put so much energy and money into the second album and it was a flop. We never recovered from that."

The Howards and Bygrave briefly reformed Goanna in late 1998, with a new line-up, to issue the group's third album, Spirit Returns, in November 1998. They disbanded again by year's end. In March 2003 Howard re-issued a remastered version of Spirit of Place, adding seven tracks of previously unreleased recordings including live versions of  "Let the Franklin Flow", "Underfoot, Underground" and "Solid Rock".

1986–present: Solo career
In 1986 Howard began performing as a solo artist with his backing band, Shane Howard and Friends, composed of former Goanna members: Marcia, Simon Curphy on guitar, Joe Imbrol on bass guitar, and Dave Stewart on drums and joined by Joe Geia on guitar and vocals. Also in that year he was a session musician on Redgum's final studio album, Midnight Sun (November 1986). In the following year he formed the Shane Howard Band with Marcia, Curphy and Geia joined by a variable line-up: Amanda Brown, Peter German, Damian Howard (his youngest brother) on guitar, Mick King, Roger Mason, Greg Pedley, John Watson, Bart Willoughby and Paul Worrell.

Howard's first solo album, Back to the Track (December 1988), was recorded and produced by the artist at Sing Sing Studios, Melbourne. He wrote eight of its ten tracks and provided lead vocals, acoustic guitar and didgeridoo. It was issued on Uluru Music with distribution by RCA Victor. The Canberra Times Matt Cowley noticed "the title reflects the past three years of his life... his journey around Australia's outback was to see the 'real' people of Australia and hear their stories... According to Howard, his songs have cultural importance though he just writes his songs for himself." A fellow reviewer at the newspaper felt that "[no] two tracks on this album are alike. Whether Howard is trying to confuse us all or show that he is indeed a diversely talented soul, he has succeeded in doing both. Blues, country, rock folk – take your pick, he does them all (and in a variety of combinations)."

Howard released his second album, River, in 1990. It was co-produced by the artist with Mark Moffatt; for the recording he used Ricky Fataar on drums, Ross Hannaford on guitar and Mark Punch on guitar. 

In 1993 Howard made his first tour of Ireland supporting Irish singer, Mary Black, whose recording of Howard's song, "Flesh & Blood", was a Top 15 hit there. Howard returned the favour when he and Black performed together with Liam O'Maonlai at the 1994 Port Fairy Folk Festival introducing her to Australian audiences. Songs from this show are included on Howard's live album, "Live in Ireland, Australia and New Zealand" (1994).

In 2010 Howard released a new album Goanna Dreaming and toured nationally his band, featuring his daughter Myra Howard, Ruben Shannon (bass), Rory McDougall (Black Arm Band) (drums), John Hudson (guitar), and Amy Saunders, formerly of Tiddas. Howard's solo album, Deeper South, was released on 6 March 2015.

In 2017, Howard and John Schumann (ex Redgum) wrote, recorded and released a single together, titled "Times Like These".

Discography

Studio albums

Live albums

Compilation albums

Singles

Awards 
In 2000 Howard was awarded a Fellowship by the Music Fund of the Australia Council in acknowledgement of his contribution to Australian musical life over many years. 

In 2016, Howard was appointed a Member of the Order of Australia for significant service to the performing arts as a singer, songwriter and guitarist, to the recording industry, and to Indigenous musicians.

On February 7 2023, the honorary degree of Deakin Honorary Doctorate was conferred upon Shane Howard AM for his distinguished career in the Australian music industry through production, songwriting and performance and for continued advocacy for Australia’s Indigenous community and the environment through his music.

Music Victoria Awards
The Music Victoria Awards are an annual awards night celebrating Victorian music. They commenced in 2006.

|-
| 2013
| Other Side of the Rock
| Best Folk Roots Album
| 
|-

Bibliography

References

External links
 

1955 births
Living people
Australian people of Irish descent
Singers from Victoria (Australia)
Musicians from Victoria (Australia)
Musicians from Geelong
APRA Award winners
Australian singer-songwriters
Members of the Order of Australia
Australian male singer-songwriters